Lakshana is an Indian television drama in the Kannada language that premiered on Colors Kannada on 9 August 2021. It stars Jaganath.C, Vijayalakshmi and Sukrutha Nag in the lead roles.The show also premiers on Voot.

Summary 
The story revolves around the lives of two girls Nakshatra and Shwetha who are exchanged in the hospital 23 years back by doctor Tulsi. Nakshatra is a dusky brown colour girl who works hard to meet the daily expenditures of the family. She has been not accepted as the daughter and granddaughter by her father Thukarama and his mother as she is not fair. He feels that Nakshatra is not his daughter as he and his wife Jaya are fair complexioned and she is in dark complexion. Bhupathi the owner of MPR Foods and S/O Shakuntala Devi is staying as a PG guest in Nkashatra's house for rent disclosing his real identity. Nakshatra who dreams of becoming TV anchor is pushed back as her skin tone will not match the requirements of an anchor. Finally she does manage to land a job as RJ where she is only the voice, while Shwetha, is the face of the show. Trouble begins when Bhupathi falls in love with her voice, while believing that it's Shwetha's.The way how Nakshatra and Shwetha meet their real parents and how Bhupathi falls in love with Nkshatra form the rest of the story.

Cast

Main 
 Jaganath.C  as Bhupathi: CEO of MPR Foods; Shakuntala Devi's 3rd son 
 Vijayalakshmi as Nakshatra: Dusky Beauty Girl
 Sukrutha Nag as Shwetha: Owner of SFM
 Vaishnavi Gowda as Vaishnavi

Recurring 
 Sudha Belawadi as Shakuntala Devi: Owner of MPR foods; Shourya, Prithvi, Bhupathi, Mourya's mother
 Roycott.S as Tukaram, the negative character playing the role of   Nakshatra / Shwetha & Shrushti's father. 
 Bhagyashri Rao as Jaya  srishti, Nakshatra/Shwetha's mother
 Archana Udupa as Dr Tulsi: who has exchanged Nakshtra and Shwetha 23 years ago 
 Sacchin Thimmaiah as Shourya: Bhupathi's 1st elder brother; Shakuntala Devi's 1st son
 Rashmi as Mayuri: Bhupathi's 1st elder sister-in-law; Shourya's wife; Shakuntala Devi's 1st daughter-in-law
 Jeevika as daughter of Shourya and Mayuri
 Krish as Prithvi: Bhupathi's 2nd elder brother; Shakuntala Devi's 2nd son
 Abhishek Shrikanth as Mourya : Shakuntala Devi's youngest son
 Sara as Shierly: Bhupathi's 2nd elder sister-in-law; Prithvi's wife; Shakuntala Devi's 2nd daughter-in-law
 JK Mysore as Munna Shakuntala devi assist
 Keerthi Bhanu as Chandrashekhar (CS) Nakshatra/Shwetha's father
 Deepa Iyer as Arathi Nakshatra/Shwetha's mother
 Priya Shatasharman as Bhargavi Nakshatra/Shwetha's aunt 
 Shruthi Ramesh as Milli: Shwetha's manager
 Uma dikshith as Seethalakshmi Tukaram's Mother Nakshatra/Shwetha's grandmother 
 Ashwini as Srishti: Nakshatra's sister; Thukaram's daughter
 Anup as Srishti's son

Dubbed versions

Production 
The show marks the comeback of actor Jaganath as a producer and actor after a brief break to serials. The show is being shot in and around Bengaluru. Some episodes of the show have been filmed in the outskirts of Bengaluru.

Soundtrack 
The title song for the series Lakshana has been sung by singer Supriya Lohith. The original music has been given by Manikanth Kadri.

References 

2021 Indian television series debuts
Colors Kannada original programming
Kannada-language television shows